Stephen Campbell Moore (born Stephen Moore Thorpe, 30 November 1979) is a British actor. He is best known for his roles in Alan Bennett's play The History Boys and the film based on it. Since 2019, he has starred in the sci-fi television series War of the Worlds.

Career
Stephen Campbell Moore was born in London as Stephen Moore Thorpe. He was educated at Berkhamsted School in Hertfordshire (appearing locally in the Pendley Open Air Shakespeare Festival) and trained at the Guildhall School of Music and Drama, alongside Orlando Bloom, where he was awarded the gold medal in his final year. He made his screen debut in Stephen Fry's Bright Young Things. He is primarily a screen actor. On stage he has performed with the RSC and the Royal National Theatre.

Campbell Moore created the role of Irwin in the original West End stage production of Alan Bennett's play The History Boys, and also played the character in the Broadway, Sydney, Wellington and Hong Kong productions and in the film version of the play.

Bennett, participating in a question-and-answer session with the play's director, Nicholas Hytner, said: "I think, of the three teachers, Stephen Campbell Moore, who plays Irwin, has the hardest job because he doesn't have the audience's sympathy until two-thirds of the way through the second act. Both Hector and Mrs Lintott have the audience on their side whereas he – who is teaching and getting results, which, in the ordinary way, parents would approve of – is not thought to be sympathetic until he reveals himself as quite vulnerable. That came as a surprise to me when I saw it rehearsed. In a sense, it takes the actors to show you what you've written".

Reviewing the play for The Guardian in May 2004, Michael Billington wrote: "Stephen Campbell Moore makes Irwin both meretricious in his methods, yet effective in his results".

In 2004, he starred as Lord Darlington alongside Scarlett Johansson in A Good Woman, based on Lady Windermere's Fan by Oscar Wilde, shot on location in Italy. In the same year, Campbell Moore played the part of Hugh Stanbury in Andrew Davies' BBC adaptation of Anthony Trollope's novel He Knew He Was Right.

In 2005, he starred as Edward VIII alongside Joely Richardson as Wallis Simpson in the British television drama Wallis & Edward. In 2008, he appeared in one episode of the television series Lark Rise to Candleford as headteacher James Delafield, featuring alongside star Julia Sawalha, and had a regular role in the BBC series Ashes to Ashes. He worked on the ABC miniseries Ben-Hur in 2009, and appeared in the 2011 film Season of the Witch. In 2012 he starred as Titus in Jean Racine's Berenice, alongside Anne-Marie Duff in the title role, at the Donmar Warehouse in London.

Campbell Moore played the role of Viscount Hugh Trimingham in the BBC's 2015 adaptation of L. P. Hartley's novel The Go-Between.

The same year, he played the role of Maurice Wilkins in Anna Ziegler's play Photograph 51, with Michael Billington writing: "The play is also anything but a one-person show. Stephen Campbell Moore catches perfectly the obduracy and awkwardness of Maurice Wilkins, forever tugging at his slightly too-long sleeves".

In 2017 he stayed in the cast of the BBC series The Last Post despite learning shortly before the start of filming that he required surgery.

An August 2018 announcement indicated that Moore would be among the new cast to join the original actors in the feature film Downton Abbey, which started principal photography at about the same time.

Recognition and awards
Campbell Moore was nominated for a 2006 Drama Desk Award for his work on the Broadway production of The History Boys.

Personal life
He underwent surgery to remove brain tumours in 2012 and 2017.

Campbell Moore married actress Claire Foy in 2014. They met while working together on the film Season of the Witch. They have a daughter together, Ivy Rose, born in 2015. In February 2018, Foy confirmed that the couple had separated.

In 2017, he met actress Sophie Cookson on the set of Red Joan; they reportedly began dating in November 2018. They have one child together, born in 2020.

Credits

Theatre

Film

Television

Video game

References

External links 
 
 

English male film actors
English male stage actors
English male television actors
English male radio actors
English male Shakespearean actors
Royal Shakespeare Company members
Alumni of the Guildhall School of Music and Drama
1979 births
Living people
21st-century English male actors